Nicholas Philpott  (c. 1695–1732), of Newton, Herefordshire, was a British politician who sat in the House of Commons from 1718 to 1727.  Philpott was the eldest son of Nicholas Philpott of Hereford and Vowchurch, Herefordshire. He matriculated at Merton College, Oxford on 22 April 1714, aged 18.
 
Philpott was returned as  Member of Parliament for Weobley at a by-election on  22 November 1718. Lord Coningsby undertook that the Government would pay half his expenses. In Parliament he voted with the Administration on the repeal of the Occasional Conformity and Schism Acts and on the Peerage Bill. He was returned again at the  1722 general election. He  was put forward as candidate at the 1727 general election  but withdrew on a compromise with the Tories.

Philpott married Elizabeth before April 1727. He lost his sanity and shot himself on 6 July 1732.

References

1690s births
1732 deaths
Members of the Parliament of Great Britain for English constituencies
British MPs 1715–1722
British MPs 1722–1727
British MPs 1727–1734
British MPs 1734–1741
British MPs 1741–1747
British MPs 1747–1754
British MPs 1754–1761
Suicides by firearm in England